Fathali-ye Soltanlu (also Romanized as Fatḩ‘alī-ye Solţānlū) is a village in Mulan Rural District, in the Central District of Kaleybar County, East Azerbaijan Province, Iran. At the 2006 census, its population was 352, in 61 families.

References 

Populated places in Kaleybar County